Kuala Krai Bridge or Sultan Ismail Suspension Bridge is a historical bridge built by the British in the 1920s. It is located on Federal Route 8 near Kuala Krai, Kelantan, Malaysia.

See also
 Transport in Malaysia

References

Bridges in Kelantan
Bridges completed in the 20th century
Kuala Krai District
20th-century architecture in Malaysia